Edward Charles Duffy (1844 – October 16, 1888) was an Irish-born professional baseball player. He played one season in Major League Baseball as an infielder in 1871 for the Chicago White Stockings. He was banned from baseball in 1865 for associating with gamblers, but was reinstated in 1870.

External links

Major League Baseball infielders
Brooklyn Eckfords (NABBP) players
New York Mutuals (NABBP) players
Chicago White Stockings (NABBP) players
Chicago White Stockings players
Irish emigrants to the United States (before 1923)
Major League Baseball players from Ireland
Irish baseball players
19th-century baseball players
1844 births
1888 deaths
Burials at Calvary Cemetery (Queens)